Max Christian Elger (born 24 November 1973) is a Swedish politician of the Social Democrats. He served as Minister for Financial Markets in the cabinet of Magdalena Andersson from 2021 to 2022.

References

Politicians from Stockholm

Living people

1973 births
Swedish Ministers for Finance
Swedish Social Democratic Party politicians
Swedish economists